The Bangladesh Navy currently operates two submarines, five guided missile frigates, two patrol frigates, six guided missile corvettes, minor surface combatants of various types including offshore patrol vessels, coastal patrol boats, missile boats, minesweepers, auxiliaries, amphibious landing craft and rapid response boats.

Bangladesh Navy vessels use the prefix BNS, standing for Bangladesh Navy Ship.

Submarines

Surface fleet

Frigates

Corvettes

Large patrol crafts

Offshore patrol vessels

Coastal patrol crafts

Fast attack crafts

Mine countermeasure vessels

High speed boats

Amphibious warfare fleet

Landing craft utility (LCU)

Landing craft tank (LCT)

Landing craft mechanized (LCM)

Landing craft vehicle & personnel (LCVP)

Auxiliary vessels

Floating drydock

Research and survey ships

Replenishment ships

Ship's tender

Diving support vessel

Tugboats

Miscellaneous

See also
 List of ships of the Bangladesh Coast Guard
 List of historic ships of the Bangladesh Navy

References

 
Bangladesh Navy ships